Mount Mannering is a mountain  south-southeast of Toilers Mountain in the King Range, Concord Mountains, Antarctica. It was named by the northern party of the New Zealand Geological Survey Antarctic Expedition, 1963–64, for Guy Mannering, a photographer at Scott Base, 1962–63.

References

Mountains of Victoria Land
Pennell Coast